The Sigma DP2 is a high-end compact digital camera introduced by the Sigma Corporation. It features a 14-megapixel Foveon X3 sensor (2652 × 1768 × 3 layers), the same sensor used in its predecessor, the Sigma DP1 and in the Sigma SD14 DSLR, a fixed 24.2mm 2.8 lens (41mm equivalent), a 2.5” LCD and a pop-up flash.

With its predecessor, the DP1, it is one of the few "compact" cameras that featured sensor with a size equivalent to APS-C. Sigma claimed this (comparatively large) sensor size would result in DSLR quality images from a small, pocketable camera. The camera does not include auto or scene modes as it is not aimed against the average consumer. The DP series are therefore targeted against professional photographers or enthusiasts seeking a compact, yet capable camera.

It was announced in September 2008, and began shipping in 2009.

Differences to the DP1 include a lens that is one stop faster, f/2.8 vs. f/4.0, 24.2 vs. 16.6mm(35mm equivalent of 41mm vs 28mm) and a faster processing chip, the True II image processor, which is shared with the Sigma SD15 DSLR.

Though claimed difficult to use, it shares many features and limitations found in rangefinder cameras such as the Leica M6, and with its mechanical-feedback manual focus, snaps images with zero shutter lag.

In February 2010, Sigma released an updated version of the camera, the Sigma DP2s. The DP2s offers a new AF algorithm, a "power save" mode and a modified rear design with new labeling of the buttons. The imaging sensor itself remained the same.

In 2012, Sigma released the 'Merrill' range of the DP series, with a much improved sensor.

Software

Sigma Photo Pro 

SIGMA Photo Pro is an exclusive software package for displaying and manipulating RAW images taken with all SIGMA digital cameras on your computer.

It can be used with raw X3F and JPEG files from all SIGMA digital cameras.

The software is free to download and install for both Windows and MacOS operating system.

References 

 Sigma announces DP2 large sensor compact
 Official Specifications at Sigma's Website
 Additional reference for specifications

DP2